Andrew Weinreich is an American serial entrepreneur. He is a pioneer in the field of social networking and has been starting and building businesses since 1997.

Education & career

Weinreich graduated from the University of Pennsylvania in 1990. He also holds a J.D. from Fordham University.

After graduating from law school, Weinreich practiced law as General Counsel and served as Vice President for the Hertz Technology Group. He had also worked as a financial analyst at Merrill Lynch & Co.

Weinreich has served as Chairman of Xtify, Founder and Chairman of MeetMoi LLC, Director of AskIt Systems, Director of Drop.io, Inc., Chairman of Board of Organic Network Inc., and Director of Organic Network Inc. He has also served as Member of Advisory Board at Visible Path Corporation and at SNAP Interactive, Inc. since September 2012.

Entrepreneurship

SixDegrees
In 1997, Weinreich launched SixDegrees. The online company was the first of its kind to allow users to identify relationships with people they know and then query for people they didn’t know through established connections, based upon the Six degrees of separation theory by Stanley Milgram. Though other services existed with similar features, SixDegrees was the first social media network to allow users to create a profile, show their friends list, and search through their friends list. Weinreich authored the first patent on social networking, “Method and apparatus for constructing a networking database and system,” commonly known as the Six Degrees patent, which secured the social media network's software code. At its height, SixDegrees had close to 100 employees and 3,500,000 fully registered members. The company was sold to YouthStream Media Networks in 1999 for $125 million. The site was closed in 2000. Weinreich later said, in reference to SixDegrees preceding the advent of widespread digital photography, "We had board meetings where we would discuss how to get people to send in their pictures and scan them in. The real difference in 2002 was that by then people had digital cameras."

Joltage
In 2001, Weinreich founded Joltage, an infrastructure services business devoted to building out a global network of Wi-Fi hotspots. The company was considered "slightly ahead of its time", hoping to "spread Wi-Fi's footprint one base at a time to neighborhoods, office parks and campuses." Joltage was forced to shut down in 2003 when the company ran out of funding.

I Stand For
In 2003, Weinreich started I Stand For, Inc., a technology solution to transfer political fundraising online with content management and community solutions. He said about the venture: "My vision five years ago was to revolutionize social networking (...) Now, it’s to revolutionize building member and constituent bases for political campaigns, not-for-profit organizations and other member-based businesses.” He sold the company in February 2006.

MeetMoi
In February 2006, Weinreich co-founded MeetMoi with Jeremy Levy. MeetMoi offers “the first location-based mobile dating service,” combining Xtify's persistent location discovery and push notification technology. The site currently has over 3 million users. When asked about MeetMoi's push-notification based platform, Weinreich responded, “There is intelligence in the cloud and it should follow you wherever you want to be followed.”

Xtify
In 2008, Weinreich and Jeremy Levy spun off the persistent tracking technologies of MeetMoi into a separate company called Xtify. Xtify was "the first geo-notification API that powers 'persistent location,' allowing a user’s location to be extracted from a mobile device on a periodic and continuous basis." Xtify was acquired by IBM on October 3, 2013.

The ‘Location-based services platform' patent, invented by Weinreich et al., is a platform providing location-based services and location data to third-party service providers, currently utilized by Xtify.

References

Living people
American technology company founders
American technology chief executives
University of Pennsylvania alumni
Fordham University alumni
American inventors
People from Brooklyn
Year of birth missing (living people)
Place of birth missing (living people)